Peter Settman (born 24 February 1969) is a Swedish actor, comedian, television presenter, screenwriter, and television producer.  Settman is known for his appearances on the comedy shows Byhåla (featuring the characters Ronny and Ragge), Så ska det låta and Dansbandskampen.

Early life
Settman was raised by his mother in Sätra. He is an only child born to parents Gunnar Törnstrand and Marianne Settman, both of whom never married each other. His father died of cancer when he was fourteen years old.

Education and career
Settman started acting in Skärholmen at the age of ten and studied at Södra Latin along with eventual Ronny and Ragge actors Fredde Granberg and Gila Bergqvist. At age 21 he acted in skits in the youth television show Kosmopol on local television in Växjö. In 1989 Settman started his production company Baluba, which he still owns and runs today.

Ronny och Ragge was one of Settman's most prominent shows. Settman played Ronny to Granberg's Ragge; the duo was depicted as typical raggare. The characters were introduced in a parody of a popular soap opera, Storstad, and became an instant hit. Settman and Granberg featured on their own show called Byhåla, which was broadcast on Sveriges Television from 1991 to 1993.  Upon the suggestion of Swedish musician Christer Sandelin, Ronny and Ragge released their own album with lyrics set to Sandelin's music, which sold 138,000 copies.

Settman and Granberg co-starred in shows such as Megafon, Äntligen Måndag, Stereo and Bara med Bruno. They went their separate ways in the late 1990s. In 2001 Settman acted in the TV4 show En ängels tålamod, where he played the character Gabriel. In 2004, he presented Melodifestivalen 2004, and became Melodifestivalen 2005'''s producer the following year. In 2006, he started presenting Så ska det låta (That's the Spirit!) on SVT and Sommarkrysset in 2005 on TV4. Between late 2008 and early 2009, he presented Dansbandskampen on Sveriges Television. During the winter of 2013-2014, he presented the talk show Settman på plats on Sveriges Television.

Personal life
Settman has two sons, Oscar and Elis, by his first wife, Sara Carlsson, and two sons, Simon and Eric, by his second wife, Anna. He resides in the Östermalm district of Stockholm.

 Television and film TulpanmysterietHalloj Holland1985:August Strindberg ett liv (TV)
1991: Kosmopol, SVT 
1991:Sommarlov SVT
1991:Gerilla TV - Laijv  SVTMegafon SVTStereo (Tratten och Finkel) SVT
1994–95: Äntligen måndag/Egäntligen måndag Snutarna1999:Browalls2000:The Road to El Dorado (Swedish voice)
2001:En ängels tålamod2004:Melodifestivalen 
2005:Melodifestivalen 
2005:Sommarkrysset 
2006:Så ska det låta 
2007–2010: Svenska Idrottsgalan 
2008:Dansbandskampen 2008 
2009:Dansbandskampen 2009 
2010:Minuten 
2012:Idéfabriken 
2013:Settman På Plats''

References

External links

1969 births
Swedish television hosts
Swedish male television actors
Living people
Swedish male comedians
Swedish screenwriters
Swedish male screenwriters
Swedish television producers
Entertainers from Stockholm
20th-century Swedish comedians
21st-century Swedish comedians